Lyudmila Alexeyevna Chursina (Russian: Людми́ла Алексе́евна Чурсина́; born 20 July 1941) is a Soviet and Russian film actress. She has appeared in more than 50 films and television shows since 1962. In 1981 she was a member of the jury at the 12th Moscow International Film Festival. At the age of 40, she is the youngest actress to receive the title of the People's Artist of the USSR.

Selected filmography
 When the Trees Were Tall (1961) as Zoya
 The Andromeda Nebula (1967) as Louma Lasvi
 Virineya (1968) as Virineya
 A Little Crane (1968) as Marfa
 The Adjutant of His Excellency (1969) as Oksana
 Goya or the Hard Way to Enlightenment (1971) as Pepa
 Olesya (1971) as Olesya
 How Czar Peter the Great Married Off His Moor (1976) as Catherine I of Russia
 Primary Russia (1985) as Aneya

Political position
On 11 March 2014, she supported the reunification of Crimea with Russia by signing collective petition to the Russian public "Culture figures of Russia - support of President Putin's position about Ukraine and Crimea".

References

External links

1941 births
Living people
Soviet film actresses
Soviet stage actresses
Soviet television actresses
Russian film actresses
Russian stage actresses
Russian television actresses
20th-century Russian actresses
21st-century Russian actresses
People's Artists of the USSR
People's Artists of the RSFSR
Recipients of the Vasilyev Brothers State Prize of the RSFSR
Communist Party of the Soviet Union members
Recipients of the Order of Honour (Russia)
Recipients of the Order of Friendship of Peoples
Academicians of the Russian Academy of Cinema Arts and Sciences "Nika"